Kensri School was established in 1998 by Mr Srish Kumar. Kensri is in the north of Bangalore near Hebbal lake. It is 5 minutes away from Lumbini Gardens amusement park. It follows CBSE, NIOS syllabus.

References

External links
Official website

1998 establishments in Karnataka
Educational institutions established in 1998
High schools and secondary schools in Bangalore